Zhang He (November 5, 1996) is a Chinese figure skater. He is the 2018 Chinese national silver medalist. He has won six ISU Junior Grand Prix medals and has competed at four World Junior Championships, placing as high as 6th.

Career 
Zhang debuted on the ISU Junior Grand Prix (JGP) series in 2010, placing 9th and 10th in his two events. The next season, he won his first medal, silver in Latvia, and placed 5th in his other event in Austria. He was sent to his first World Junior Championships, finishing 6th.

In 2012–13, Zhang missed the JGP series but was sent to the 2013 World Junior Championships where he finished 9th.

During the 2013–14 JGP series, Zhang won silver in Slovakia and bronze in Poland. He was 11th at the 2014 World Junior Championships.

Zhang won two medals during the  2014–15 JGP series, silver in Germany and bronze in Estonia. At the 2015 World Junior Championships in Tallinn, Estonia, he placed 13th.

During the 2015–16 JGP series, Zhang won a bronze medal in Spain, and was 4th in Croatia. At the 2016 World Junior Championships in Debrecen, Hungary, he placed 10th in both segments and overall.

Programs

Competitive highlights
GP: Grand Prix; JGP: Junior Grand Prix

Detailed results

Senior level

Junior level 

 QR = Qualifying round

References

External links 

 

1996 births
Living people
Chinese male single skaters
Figure skaters from Changchun